Lino Lakes is a city in Anoka County, Minnesota, United States. The population was 21,399 at the 2020 census. Interstates 35W and 35E are two of Lino Lakes's main routes. It is an outer suburb north of the Twin Cities.

History
When European settlers arrived, Native Americans already lived in the area where what are now called Reshanau, Baldwin, Rice and Marshan Lakes cluster. The Dakota people found this to be a land of plenty, with abundant wild rice and small game. Several Native American burial grounds are in the area. White hunters and trappers began coming to the area from both Canada and the eastern states around 1850. Those who settled on the lake's west side had names like Ramsden, Speiser, and Wenzel. The east side was settled by families including the Cardinals, LaMottes, Houles and Dupres. Many of their descendants still live in the area.

Several names were suggested for the new village, most containing the word "lakes". The origin of the word "Lino" is unknown. A Lino post office operated for about 10 years in the late 1800s. The town board decided to name the new village Lino Lakes. On May 11, 1955, the Village of Lino Lakes was incorporated. It covered the original Centerville Township except the Village of Centerville, and comprised 21,000 acres of land and 1,800 citizens. In 1972, the state legislature changed all Minnesota villages to cities.

The area's first unit of local government was the township of Centerville, organized on August 11, 1857, and encompassing 36 square miles. The population of just under 300 was organized into three loosely knit communities known as the "German settlement" west of the lakes, the "Swede settlement" south of the lakes, and the "French settlement" east of the lakes. In the 1950s neighboring villages started annexing land from Centerville Township. To protect the boundaries and allow for the financing of public improvements, the township residents voted to incorporate into a village.

On July 26, 2010, the Lino Lakes City Council voted 4–1 to establish English as Lino Lakes's official language. The resolution stated that all official documents would be prepared in English and that the city would not pay for translation of its documents into any other language. Proponents argued that expenses related to translation of governmental expenses were unnecessary. On the other hand, the resolution has been perceived as connected to the English-only movement. MetroNorth Chamber of Commerce president Lori Higgins said, "it makes the area appear unwelcoming."

Geography
A total of 44% of the city's land was developed in 2010, compared to 37% in 2000.

Rice Creek flows through the city. Rice Creek Chain of Lakes Regional Park Reserve is in Lino Lakes.

Lino Lakes's main shopping area is the Town Center at the intersection of Interstate 35W and County 23–Lake Drive. It includes a SuperTarget and Kohl's, a YMCA, civic complex and other offices, medical and retail.

Demographics

2010 census
As of the census of 2010, there were 20,216 people, 4,174 households, and 3,683 families living in the city. The racial makeup of the city was 94.14% White, 1.1% African American, 2.03% Native American, 2.6% Asian, 0.1% Pacific Islander, 0.3% from other races, and 0.6% from two or more races. Hispanic or Latino of any race were 2.7% of the population.

There were 6,174 households, of which 48.1% had children under age 18 living with them, 73.2% were married couples living together, 7.2% had a female householder with no husband present, 3.5% had a male householder with no wife present, and 16.1% were non-families. 12.0% of all households were made up of individuals, and 2.4% had someone living alone who was 65 or older. The average household size was 3.05 and the average family size was 3.37.

The median age in the city was 37.44. 28.8% of residents were under 18; 7.8% were between 18 and 24; 27.1% were from 25 to 44; 31.6% were from 45 to 64; and 4.8% were 65 or older. The gender makeup of the city was 53.8% male and 46.2% female.

2000 census
As of the census of 2000, there were 11,791 people, 3,857 households, and 3,162 families living in the city. The racial makeup of the city was 95.56% White, 0.9% African American, 1.0% Native American, 1.4% Asian, 0.01% Pacific Islander, 0.68% from other races, and 1.22% from two or more races. Hispanic or Latino of any race were 1.54% of the population.

There were 3,857 households, of which 55.9% had children under 18 living with them, 77.6% were married couples living together, 5.0% had a female householder with no husband present, and 14.3% were non-families. 10.0% of all households were made up of individuals, and 2.1% had someone living alone who was 65 or older. The average household size was 3.20 and the average family size was 3.44.

In the city, the population was spread out, with 33.7% under 18, 6.6% from 18 to 24, 39.8% from 25 to 44, 16.7% from 45 to 64, and 3.3% who were 65 or older. The median age was 33. For every 100 females, there were 118.3 males. For every 100 females 18 and over, there were 124.8 males.

The median income for a household was $75,708, and the median income for a family was $79,183. Males had a median income of $56,088 versus $37,220 for females. The per capita income was $25,419. About 1.1% of families and 2.0% of the population were below the poverty line, including 2.6% of those under 18 and 1.4% of those 65 or older.

Parks and recreation
The Lakes Parks and Recreation Department is responsible for the development and maintenance of the parks and trails system. Development of the parks system includes installing playground equipment, and benches, irrigation, and landscaping projects. Staff maintains 11 softball/baseball fields, 12 soccer fields and three ice rinks, and about 30 miles of trails. The 5,500-acre Rice Creek Chain of Lakes Regional Park Reserve is one of the seven-county metropolitan area's largest parks and contains some of the most significant native wildlife habitat and water resources in the region.

Education
Public education in Lino Lakes is provided by the Centennial School District and the Forest Lakes School Area. Schools in Lino Lakes include Blue Heron Elementary, Lino Lakes Elementary, Pine School and Rice Lake Elementary.

References

External links
 Lino Lakes City Website

Cities in Anoka County, Minnesota
Cities in Minnesota